Selahattin Özmen is a Turkish plastic surgeon. A full-professor of Plastic Surgery at the Koç University School of Medicine, Department of Plastic Surgery and American Hospital Department of Plastic Surgery in İstanbul, he performed Turkey's third face transplant in 2012 at Gazi University / Ankara.

Education
After graduating from the Faculty of Medicine at the Hacettepe University, he completed his special studies in plastic and reconstructive surgery between 1995 and 2002 at the Gazi University, Department of Plastic, Reconstructive and Aesthetic Surgery, between 2002 and 2003 at The Cleveland Clinic Foundation in Cl/Ohio/USA, in 2004 at Sahlgrenska Akademin in Gothenburg, Sweden and in 2006 in Hamburg, Germany (http://www.selahattinozmen.com.tr/biyografi)

Achievements
Selahattin Özmen performed Turkey's third face transplant, first woman-to-woman and first three-dimensional (with bone tissue), face transplant, a partial face transplant, on March 17, 2012 on Hatice Nergis, a twenty-year-old woman, at Gazi University's hospital in Ankara. The patient from Kahramanmaraş had lost six years ago her upper jaw including mouth, lips, palate, teeth and nasal cavity by a firearm accident, and was since then unable to eat. She had undergone in the past around 35 reconstructive plastic surgery operations. The donor was a 28-year-old woman in Istanbul, who committed suicide.

References

External links
 Google Scholar profile

Living people
Turkish plastic surgeons
Organ transplantation
Hacettepe University alumni
Gazi University alumni
Academic staff of Gazi University
Date of birth missing (living people)
Place of birth missing (living people)
Year of birth missing (living people)